Klare is a surname. Notable people with the surname include:

 Arno Klare, German politician
 George R. Klare, professor of psychology and dean at Ohio University and World War II veteran
 Herman Klare, chemistry academic
 Karl Klare, professor at Northeastern University School of Law
 Léon Klares, Luxembourgian sprint canoer
 Michael Klare, professor of Peace and World Security Studies at Hampshire College and defense correspondent of The Nation magazine

See also
 1825 Klare, a main-belt asteroid
 Klare Grete, a river in Germany
 Clare (disambiguation)
 Clair (disambiguation)